Archiv des Todes (German: Archives of Death) is a 1980 13-part East German war television film series set during World War II.

Cast
Jürgen Zartmann: Georg
Gojko Mitić: Boris
Gerd Blahuschek: Ernst
Leon Niemczyk: Janek
Krzysztof Stroiński: Heiner
Barbara Brylska: Hanka
Renate Blume: Renate
Alfred Struwe: Standartenführer Hauk
Heidemarie Wenzel: Mrs. von Teschendorf
Hannjo Hasse: Major Zirrgiebel
Joachim Tomaschewsky: Beisel
Helmut Schellhardt: Henselma

See also
List of German television series

External links
 

German drama television series
1980 German television series debuts
1980 German television series endings
World War II television drama series
German-language television shows
Television series based on actual events
Television in East Germany